During the 13th century England was partially ruled by Archbishops, Bishops, Earls (Counts), Barons, marcher Lords, and knights. All of these except for the knights would always hold most of their fiefs as tenant in chief. Although the kings maintained control of huge tracts of lands through judges, constables, castles, and sheriffs, the nobles of England were still powerful. This is a list of the various different nobles and magnates including both lords spiritual and lords secular. It also includes nobles who were vassals of the king but were not based in England (Welsh, Irish, French). Additionally nobles of lesser rank who appear to have been prominent in England at the time. The nobles are listed categorically by rank starting with the Archbishops and going down to the nobles who did not hold titles.

Archbishops 
The word Archbishop originates as an additional honor for powerful bishops who held sway over several dioceses. Archbishops were usually associated with an important city holding land and influence within the city

Note: Several Archbishops are not listed because they were either not consecrated, set aside within 3 years, did not rule for more than a year, or were quashed by the pope/the king.

Earls/Counts 
Earls (referred to as Comitis in records) were powerful lords holding their lands per baronium. Technically they were the kings highest representative in their given shires (outranking even the sheriff who were referred to as vicecomitem (Vice-Counts)), for example the Earl of Devon would be the highest administrator of Devonshire, however he was not the overlord of the barons in Devonshire (though he could be for certain manors but the baron could just as well be the overlord of a different manor which the earl possessed).

Lords Spiritual 
The lords spiritual were bishops, abbots, and other leading clergymen who functioned similarly to feudal barons holding their land per baronium. Generally they were centered at a cathedral or abbey and not a castle and although some were expected to provide soldiers for the king, they were not expected to fight themselves (however some of them did). Bishops who ruled for less than three years will not be listed to avoid clutter.

Barons & Royal Demesne Equivalents  

Holding land per baronium (by barony) was considered the highest form of land tenure. Barons were generally tenants in chief who held usually 10-50 manors, often scattered around but usually with a general grouping of estates around the Caput Baronium. Many of these manors were held by knights who provided military service to their lord. Often a few of the baron's manors were held from another tenant in chief. A barony with more than 20 manors in it was termed an honour. Most bishops also held their land per baronium and all earls held their land per baronium.

Welsh Marcher Barons Under the Crown

Marcher-lords enjoyed a greater degree of independence, holding almost all feudal rights to build castles, have sheriffs, declare war, establish boroughs, establish markets, confiscate lands, legislative power and hold mini parliament. However, they could not mint coins nor could they judge someone guilty of high treason, and if they died without heirs, their land would revert to the crown. Marcher lordships seem to have functioned in a similar way to that of a state in the Holy Roman Empire, enjoying extensive freedom but still subject to the crown.

Feudal Barons and Barons by Writ Under the Crown

The difference between a feudal barony and a barony by writ is not a clear distinction since barons had been summoned for council before the parliaments of that later 13th century. Barons who attended the Curia Regis of 1237 were undoubtedly equal in rank to the ones later summoned to the parliaments of 1246 and beyond. In fact many of the barons attending the Curia Regis were predecessors to those attending the later Parliaments.

Bedfordshire

Berkshire

Buckinghamshire

Cambridgeshire

Cornwall

Cumbria

Derbyshire

Devonshire

Dorset

Essex

Gascony

Gloucestershire

Hampshire

Herefordshire

Hertfordshire

Huntingdonshire

Kent

Lancashire

Leicestershire

Lincolnshire

Middlesex

Norfolk

Northampton

Northumberland

Nottinghamshire

Oxfordshire

Shropshire

Somerset

Staffordshire

Suffolk

Surrey

Sussex

Warwickshire

Westmorland

Wiltshire

Worcestershire

Yorkshire

Unknown/Unclassifiable

Barons by Service to the Crown

These were royal servants who were deemed to have held the status of baron even if they did not hold any land.

Under the Earls of Chester:

The earls of Chester were considered earls-palatine of the earldom of Chester. They had almost complete rights over their domain and ruled like kings: they had their own court with their own barons, and their own justices. Chester was last held be a non-royal by John the Scot who died in 1237. It then passed to the crown and was given to a royal relative.

De Facto Under the Justiciar of Ireland:

These lords were the descendants of norman adventurers who had come over to Ireland following Richard FitzGodbert de Roche, Strong-bow, and others who had originally come as mercenaries for an Irish prince. These Norman adventurers had continued their predecessors conquest by making alliances, truces, pushing wars, etc. Although briefly almost independent of England, royal authority was soon established in Ireland.

Under the Barons of Fingal (lordship of Meath Ireland):

Hugh de Lacey was granted the lordship of Meath shortly after the invasion of Ireland. However there was an Irish king who claimed the land as his own. Hugh invited this king to parley but it went poorly and it ended in the Irish being slaughtered. Because of nature of the lordship Hugh had the authority to appoint his own barons and had similar powers to a marcher lord

Under the earls of Pembroke:

Knights and Officials of the Royal household  
These are companions of the Kings of England during the 13th century. The kings kept household knights and a variety of skilled noblemen including administrators, scribes, and judges in his court in order to do his bidding in administrative, military and judicial matters. In many cases noblemen would serve in more than one office depending on their favor with the king at the time. These nobles tended to be lesser nobles who acquired land, offices, and titles by service to the king. The office or Royal Steward was the highest office in the kings household who was responsible for managing the entire household including ensuring discipline within the ranks of the household knights.

Under King John:

Under Henry III of England:

Under Edward I:

Other Nobles 

Note: Since these nobles generally did not hold a title the dates which they are marked by is when they lived, not when the reigned.

References 

English history-related lists
13th-century English nobility
13th-century English monarchs